Alkestis nevermanni is a species of beetle in the family Carabidae, the only species in the genus Alkestis.

References

Lebiinae